Nancy Ponzi (born 19 August 1941) is a pioneer of the Oregon wine industry and the Oregon brewing industry, and the founder of Ponzi Vineyards, one of the Willamette Valley's founding wineries. She and her husband Dick Ponzi also established Oregon's first craft brewery, Bridgeport Brewing Company.

Early life 
Ponzi was born in the Southern Californian town of Fullerton and spent her childhood traveling all over the world. She met Dick Ponzi after he moved to California for a job in the aerospace industry and the couple married in 1962.

Career

Teaching 
While living in California, Ponzi worked as a teacher at a Montessori school.

Ponzi Vineyards 

After several research trips to Burgundy, Ponzi and her husband moved their family to the Willamette Valley and purchased 20 acres of land southwest of Portland, Oregon, in 1969. They established Ponzi Vineyards in 1970. At the time, there were just four other wineries in the state. The location was close to Portland, an important factor as they expected the city to be their main market. In 1974, they produced their first vintage of 100 cases of Pinot noir and quickly became known as innovators in enology and viticulture. In the early years of the vineyard, Ponzi continued to work as a teacher while also marketing the wine they produced.

The Ponzis planted a two-acre plot of Pinot noir clones in 1975 in a joint venture with Oregon State University to test the clones. In 1981, they purchased a 20-acre parcel that included these two acres, creating their Abetina vineyard (named for the fir trees on the property). The same year they purchased 10 acres downslope from Abetina, which became the Madrona vineyard. Eight acres on the Madrona site were planted with Pinot noir in 1985.

Ponzi Vineyards was among the first to plant Pinot gris commercially in Oregon in 1978, releasing the first bottling in 1984.

In 1991, the Ponzis purchased a 65-acre vineyard named Aurora, which included plantings that used to study stocks, varieties and clones.

In 2008, the Ponzis designed and built a four-level, gravity-flow winery measuring 30,000 square feet. It is noted for its eco-friendliness and high level of sustainability. Ponzi's vineyards are LIVE (Low Input Viticulture & Enology) certified.

Bridgeport Brewing 
Ponzi and her husband also founded Oregon's first craft brewery, Bridgeport Brewing Company, in 1984, a move which is credited with launching the area's craft brewing craze and helping to popularize India Pale Ale in the United States. They sold the brewery in 1995 to The Gambrinus Company.

Community work 
Ponzi was and remains active in community and charitable efforts. She co-founded the Consumers' Food Council, was a founding director of the Washington County Wineries Association and held various offices in the Oregon Winegrowers Association.

She also co-founded the International Pinot Noir Celebration in 1987, a yearly international event that draws thousands of attendees to McMinnville, Oregon.

In 1991, Ponzi partnered with Tuality Healthcare and founded ¡Salud!, an organization that assists vineyard workers and their families with accessing healthcare and provides wellness screenings via a mobile medical unit. She currently serves on Tuality Healthcare's Board of Directors.

She co-founded Oregon Pinot Camp in 2000, an annual trade-education event that attracts wine industry professionals to the Willamette Valley.

Other 
On December 1, 2009, Ponzi published The Ponzi Vineyards Cookbook, a collection of recipes she developed after decades of feeding family, guests and vineyard crews. Interspersed throughout the book are anecdotes about life in the vineyard. She had previously published recipes in The Vintner's Kitchen by Bill King.

Family 

Ponzi married Dick Ponzi in 1962 in California.

The entire family was involved in the vineyards and winemaking from the start, with the Ponzi children helping after school and on weekends. Once grown, the children pursued other interests: Anna Maria worked in the magazine business on the East Coast before returning to the winery in 1992; Luisa attended Portland State University and prepared for medical school, returning to the family business in 1990 and deciding to pursue winemaking. She went on to train in Burgundy, France, and earn a degree in viticulture and enology. In 1993, Dick Ponzi passed the title and duties of Winemaker to her.

Awards and recognition 

In 2007, the Oregon Wine Board awarded Dick and Nancy Ponzi a Lifetime Achievement Award.

Influence 
In 1985, Ponzi was among a group that authored a bill that led to the legalization of brewpubs and tasting rooms in Oregon.

See also 
 History of Oregon Wine
 Oregon Wine

Notes

References

External links 
 Women in Wine - Nancy Ponzi, by Linfield College Archives (video)

American winemakers
1941 births
Living people
People from Newberg, Oregon